Eustromula valida is a species of beetle in the family Cerambycidae. It was described by John Lawrence LeConte in 1858, and placed in the new genus Eustromula by Cockerell in 1909

References

Elaphidiini
Beetles described in 1858